The Black Album is the sixteenth studio album by American recording artist Prince. It was re-released with re-mastered audio (and a few song title revisions) on November 22, 1994, by Warner Bros. Records after its original release on December 8, 1987, as the follow-up to Sign o' the Times and was to appear in an entirely black sleeve with no title or even a credit to Prince; hence it was referred to as The Black Album. Dubbed The Funk Bible by preceding press releases, and in a hidden message within the album itself, the work seemed to be a reaction to criticism that Prince had become too pop-oriented. It was his attempt to regain his Black audience.

The 1987 promo-only release had no printed title, artist name, production credits or photography printed; a simple black sleeve accompanied the disc. On promotional copies, only a song listing and catalog number—25677—were printed on the disc itself. The commercial version was to only have the catalog number—printed in pink—on the spine. The original compact disc pressing was made by Sony DADC rather than WEA Manufacturing. After Prince became convinced that the album was "evil", he ordered it to be withdrawn a week before its release date. It was replaced with the album Lovesexy, a brighter pop-oriented album with elements of religious affirmation.

Music 
Prince invoked Camille, the alter-ego behind his unreleased 1986 album Camille, as the guiding force responsible for The Black Album.

The opening track also mentioned the title of the album as being The Funk Bible, which was a consideration during work on this project. The title refers both to the album's all-Black cover design and to Prince's attempt to earn back his credibility among the Black pop audience.

The album features one of the most atypical Prince songs: "Bob George", in which he assumes the identity of a profane man who suspects his girlfriend to have had an affair with a man named Bob. He asks her what the man does for a living and learns that Bob manages Prince, whom he dismisses as "that skinny motherfucker with the high voice". The gun-wielding alter ego then fires a multitude of gunshots, and ends up being raided by the police. During live performances of the song during the Lovesexy Tour, he ends up being shot. The name for the track was a combination of Bob Cavallo (former manager), and Nelson George, who was felt to have become very critical of Prince. "Bob George" features a growling monologue that is pitched down (using a Publison) to the point of being almost unrecognizable as Prince. The voice at the end of the song that says "bizarre" is actually a stock sound from the Fairlight CMI IIx library, with its pitch raised.

The Black Album features songs such as the hip hop parody "Dead on It", which playfully makes the accusation that all MCs are tone-deaf and unable to sing, and the playful "Cindy C.", which refers to supermodel Cindy Crawford. The rhyme at the end of the song was originally written by Steve "Silk" Hurley and was included on a song titled "Music Is the Key", which was previously released by Chicago house-music group JM Silk, of which Hurley was the founder. Hurley would later go on to remix two of the songs from the "Gett Off" maxi-single, the Housestyle and Flutestramental versions.

The album contains several instances of the portrayal of characters, using either a sped-up or slowed-down vocal track by Prince (as on "If I Was Your Girlfriend", "U Got the Look", "Strange Relationship", and "Housequake", all from the Sign o' the Times album).

The instrumental jazz-funk jam "2 Nigs United 4 West Compton" was revisited as a live song on the One Nite Alone... Live! album, but it was hardly the same track.

"Rockhard in a Funky Place" was originally considered for inclusion on the Camille project and then the planned Crystal Ball album. After the album's fade out, dissonant feedback fades in, followed by Prince saying "What kind of fuck ending was that?" before fading out again. "When 2 R in Love" is the only ballad on the album, and reappeared on Lovesexy, which was released the next year.

Prince performed "Bob George", parts of "When 2 R in Love", and "Superfunkycalifragisexy" on his Lovesexy Tour. "When 2 R in Love" was usually part of the piano medley in Act II, whereas the other two songs were part of the Act I segment, where Prince's evil side showed through (coinciding with the idea that The Black Album was evil, hence its being pulled from release by Prince). Act II was his born-again segment, with more upbeat spiritual songs, highlighting most of the Lovesexy songs, and top 40 hits.

Samples of "Bob George" would later show up on the "Dub Beats" official promo mix of Madonna's 1989 single "Like a Prayer".

Withdrawal 
The album was abandoned shortly before its intended release after Prince experienced a spiritual epiphany and became convinced it was "evil"; he later blamed the album on an entity named Spooky Electric, described as a demonic, low-voiced alter-ego induced by Camille. The decision may have been influenced by Prince's having a bad experience on MDMA. Prince recalled all copies and abandoned the entire project, leaving roughly 100 European promotional copies in circulation, and several American copies that would be widely bootlegged in the coming years.

Immediately after the decision to pull The Black Album from stores, the album emerged on the streets in bootleg form, arguably becoming popular music's most legendary bootleg since the Beach Boys' aborted 1967 album Smile.

In the music video for the lead single from Lovesexy, "Alphabet St.", a message quickly scrolls down the screen that reads: "Don't buy The Black Album, I'm sorry."

In April 2016, an original promo copy from 1987 was sold on Discogs' marketplace for a then-record of US$15,000.00. In 2017, five copies were discovered in the United States, with one of those selling for US$42,298. In June 2018, another copy of the original album was found in Canada—this copy later sold on the Discogs marketplace for $27,500.

Legal release 
The Black Album was finally released by Warner Bros. Records on November 22, 1994—again, containing only a track listing and the new catalog number 45793 printed onto the disc itself, and a copyright date of 1994 (with the exception of "When 2 R in Love", which was released in 1988 on Lovesexy). Although it was released in a strictly limited edition and was pulled on January 27, 1995, the album was re-released exclusively to Tidal in 2016.

In the week of the album's official release, Warner ran an ad at the back of the November 26, 1994, issue of Billboard that offered owners of counterfeit copies a free copy of the legal release, provided they mail their bootleg copy to the label in exchange. This offer was given only to the first 1,000 individuals who sent in their copies.

Reception 
Reactions to the 1987 promo release were largely positive. Several celebrities, including U2's The Edge and Bono, cited it as one of their favorite albums of 1988 in a Rolling Stone magazine poll. Robert Christgau, writing in The Village Voice, compared Prince's approach to George Clinton's "sonic wallop and communal craziness", adding that "the bassy murk never lets up, and at its weirdest [...] it's as dark as "Cosmic Slop."" Commenting on the scarcity of advance-release copies, he recommended that "those who pine for heavy funk should nag their local dealers". The New York Times''' Jon Pareles remarked that both The Black Album and Lovesexy "show a musician experimenting like mad with every musical parameter, and so prolific that he has to cut back his output so he won't be competing with himself". He observed that The Black Album "answers the Beatles' eclectic White Album with Prince's own tour of black music styles (from a skeletal, synthesized blues to a rap, with extended stops at James Brown, Sly and the Family Stone and Parliament-Funkadelic); it has black humor and nasty fantasies."

Retrospective reviews since the album's limited official release have been more mixed. In one of the few unambiguously negative appraisals, Selects Matt Hall panned the album as "the sound of someone losing step with the times", and was particularly critical of Prince's "embarrassing, bitter rant against hip hop" on "Dead on It". David Browne of Entertainment Weekly believed that The Black Album had not aged well by 1994, writing that "[i]n the pre-gangsta days of 1987, The Black Album was jarring, but now that our ears have become jaded — at times liberated — it sounds downright average", but offered praise for the "spooky, scary, and funny, sometimes all at once" "Bob George". More sympathetically, Stephen Thomas Erlewine of Allmusic opined that the album "isn't a lost masterwork -- it's fun, but not much more". He criticized "When 2 R in Love" as "nondescript" and "Dead on It" as "one of the lamest things he ever waxed", but declared that "[t]he rest of the eight-song album is brilliant, pure funk" and "a terrific little record that still delights, even after its mystique has faded".

 Track listing 

 Personnel 
 Prince – lead vocals and various instruments
 Sheila E. – backing vocals (1), percussion (2), drums (7)
 Eric Leeds – saxophone (1, 2, 8)
 Atlanta Bliss – trumpet (1, 2, 8)
 Cat Glover – backing vocals (1), backing vocals and rap (2), spoken vocals (7)
 Boni Boyer – backing vocals (1)
 Susannah Melvoin – backing vocals (8)
 Susan Rogers – engineer

 Charts 

 References NotesSources' 

 External links 
 The Black Album at Discogs
 Public Notice: Bootleg Copies of "Black" Album — By Billboard'' (Advertisement by Warner Bros. Records)
 What I'm Listening to Now: The Black Album — By Questlove

1994 albums
Prince (musician) albums
Albums produced by Prince (musician)
Warner Records albums
Albums recorded in a home studio
Albums recorded at Sunset Sound Recorders